Following are the statistics of the Danish Championship League in the 1938–39 season.

Overview
It was contested by 10 teams, and Boldklubben af 1893 won the championship.

League standings

References
Denmark - List of final tables (RSSSF)

Top level Danish football league seasons
Den
1938–39 in Danish football